Erlin-2 is a protein that in humans is encoded by the ERLIN2 gene.

Model organisms
Model organisms have been used in the study of ERLIN2 function. A conditional knockout mouse line called Erlin2tm1a(EUCOMM)Wtsi was generated at the Wellcome Trust Sanger Institute. Male and female animals underwent a standardized phenotypic screen to determine the effects of deletion. Additional screens performed:  - In-depth immunological phenotyping

References

Further reading